Eva María Gómez Sánchez (born 30 June 1971 in Seville) is a Spanish-born Chilean journalist and TV hostess.

Biography 
Moved to Chile in 1995. Mother of Fernando Pesce and Matías Pesce with ex-husband Fernando Pesce. Studied journalism at Diego Portales University. Close friend of Benjamín Vicuña's sister. Mother of Triana Morales with Pablo Morales. Has two older brothers.

Filmography

References

External links 
 

                   

1971 births
Chilean women journalists
Chilean television presenters
Spanish emigrants to Chile
Living people
People from Seville
Diego Portales University alumni
Chilean women television presenters
Chilean television personalities